Theresa Harris (December 31, 1906 – October 8, 1985) was an American television and film actress, singer and dancer.

Early life
Harris was born on New Year's Eve 1906 (some sources indicate 1909) in Houston, Texas, to Isaiah and Mable Harris, both of whom were former sharecroppers from Louisiana. 

Harris' family relocated to Southern California when she was 11 years old. After graduating Jefferson High School, she studied at the UCLA Conservatory of Music and Zoellner's Conservatory of Music. She then joined the Lafayette Players, an African American musical comedy theatre troupe.

Career
She made her film debut in 1929 in Thunderbolt, singing the song "Daddy Won't You Please Come Home". As she entered the 1930s, she played, often without credit, maids to characters acted by Ginger Rogers, Bette Davis, Sylvia Sidney, Frances Dee, Myrna Loy, Jean Harlow, Thelma Todd, Kay Francis, and Barbara Stanwyck. She also floated around studios doing bit-parts, usually at Warner Bros. or Metro-Goldwyn-Mayer, variously as a blues singer, waitress, tribal woman, prostitute, and hat check girl.

Harris had a featured role as a friend of star Jean Harlow in MGM's Hold Your Man (1933), co-starring Clark Gable. In 1933, she appeared as Chico in the Warner Bros. pre-Code production of Baby Face, starring Barbara Stanwyck. That same year, Harris starred in a substantial role opposite Ginger Rogers in Professional Sweetheart. As Rogers's character's maid, Harris's character subs for Rogers's character as a singer on the radio. Despite the fact that Harris's character was a major point for the story's plot development, she was uncredited for the role.

Throughout the 1930s, Harris played many uncredited parts in films such as Horse Feathers (1932), Gold Diggers of 1933 (1933), Mary Stevens, M.D. (1933) and Morning Glory (1933). She also played Bette Davis's maid Zette in the film Jezebel (1938). In 1937, she appeared in the race film Bargain with Bullets opposite Ralph Cooper for Million Dollar Productions, co-owned by Cooper. While doing promotion for the film, Harris spoke about her frustration over the difficulty African American actors faced in the film industry stating,
I never had the chance to rise above the role of maid in Hollywood movies. My color was against me anyway you looked at it. The fact that I was not "hot" stamped me either as uppity or relegated me to the eternal role of stooge or servant. [...] My ambition is to be an actress. Hollywood had no parts for me.
She also praised Ralph Cooper for starting a production company that produced films starring African American actors. She said,
We have nothing to lose in the development of an all-colored motion picture company. The competition will make Hollywood perk up and produce better films with our people in a variety of roles.
Harris continued to lobby for better parts within Hollywood but found few opportunities. In the 1939 movie Tell No Tales she was credited for playing Ruby, the wife of a murdered man. Harris played an emotional scene with Melvin Douglas at the funeral. She appears in a small but vivid role as Kathie Moffat's ex-maid Eunice Leonard in Jacques Tourneur 1947 Out of the Past.

In addition to films, Harris also performed in many radio programs, including Hollywood Hotel. Harris was often paired with Eddie Rochester Anderson, who portrayed her on-screen boyfriend. They appeared together in Buck Benny Rides Again (1940) and What's Buzzin' Cousin (1943). In Buck Benny Rides Again, Harris and Anderson performed the musical number "My, My," where they sing and dance tap, classical, Spanish, and swing. She also appeared in several prominent roles for RKO Pictures as she was a favorite of producer Val Lewton who routinely cast African American actors in non-stereotypical roles. In 1942, Lewton cast Harris as a sarcastic waitress in Cat People, followed by roles in I Walked with a Zombie (1943), Phantom Lady (1944), and Strange Illusion (1945).

During the 1950s, Harris appeared several times on television on such shows as Lux Video Theatre, Alfred Hitchcock Presents, and Letter to Loretta. She made her last film appearance in an uncredited role in The Gift of Love in 1958.

Personal life
Harris married George Robinson, a doctor, in 1933.  She retired from acting in the late 1950s, living comfortably off careful investments made during her career.

Harris was a Methodist. A Democrat, she supported the presidential campaign of Adlai Stevenson in 1952.

On October 8, 1985, Harris died of undisclosed causes in Inglewood, California. She was buried in Angelus-Rosedale Cemetery in Los Angeles, California.

Legacy
The title character in Lynn Nottage's 2011 play By the Way, Meet Vera Stark is based in part on Theresa Harris.

Selected filmography

Thunderbolt (1929) as Black Cat Cafe Singer (uncredited)
Morocco (1930) as Camp Follower (uncredited)
The Road to Reno (1931) as Maid at Dude Ranch (uncredited)
Arrowsmith (1931) as Native Mother (uncredited)
Union Depot (1932) as Black Woman (uncredited)
Merrily We Go to Hell (1932) as Powder Room Attendant (uncredited)
Week Ends Only (1932) as Chloë (uncredited)
Horse Feathers (1932) as Laura, Connie's maid (uncredited)
Free Wheeling (1932, Short) as Maid
Faithless (1932) as Amanda (uncredited)
Night After Night (1932) as Ladies' Room Attendant (uncredited)
The Sport Parade (1932) as Nightclub Dancer (uncredited)
The Half-Naked Truth (1932) as Emily, Teresita's Maid (uncredited)
Grand Slam (1933) as Ladies' Room Attendant (uncredited)
Gold Diggers of 1933 (1933) as Black Woman in 'Pettin' in the Park' Number (uncredited)
Professional Sweetheart (1933) as Vera, Glory's Maid (uncredited)
Private Detective 62 (1933) as Janet's Maid (uncredited)
Hold Your Man (1933) as Lily Mae Crippen, reformatory inmate (uncredited)
Baby Face (1933) as Chico
Mary Stevens, M.D. (1933) as Alice,  Andrews' Maid (uncredited)
Morning Glory (1933) as Minor Role (uncredited)
Penthouse (1933) as Lili, Mimi's Maid (uncredited)
Broadway Through a Keyhole (1933) as Joan's Maid (uncredited)
Blood Money (1933) as Jessica (uncredited)
The Worst Woman in Paris? (1933) as Lily, the Maid
Roman Scandals (1933) as Handmaiden (uncredited)
Flying Down to Rio (1933) as Dancer (uncredited)
Success at Any Price (1934) as Marie, Agnes' Maid (uncredited)
A Modern Hero (1934) as Leah's Maid (uncredited)
Sleepers East (1934) as Gloria Washington (uncredited)
Finishing School (1934) as Evelyn,  Mrs Radcliff's maid (uncredited)
Drums O' Voodoo (1934)
Operator 13 (1934) as Slave at Medicine Show (uncredited)
Black Moon (1934) as Sacrificed Girl (uncredited)
Desirable (1934) as Ladies Room Maid at Party (uncredited)
Go Into Your Dance (1935) as Luana's Maid (uncredited)
Broadway Melody of 1936 (1935) as Theresa (uncredited)
In Person (1935) as Carol's Maid (uncredited)
Strike Me Pink (1936) as Dancer / Singer in 'First You Have Me High (Then You Have Me Low)' (uncredited)
The Green Pastures (1936) as Angel (uncredited)
15 Maiden Lane (1936) as Ladies Room Maid (uncredited)
Banjo On My Knee (1936) as Black Blues Singer (uncredited)
Charlie Chan at the Olympics (1937) as Black US Team Member On Sidelines Rooting for Jesse Owens (uncredited)
The Lady Escapes (1937) as Maid (uncredited)
Big Town Girl (1937) as Maid (uncredited)
Gangsters on the Loose (1937) as Grace Foster
Jezebel (1938) as Zette
The Toy Wife (1938) as 'Pick'
Passport Husband (1938) as Maid (uncredited)
Tell No Tales (1939) as Ruby
The Women (1939) as Olive (uncredited)
One Hour to Live (1939) as High Yaller girl
City of Chance (1940) as Beulah, Powder Room Attendant (uncredited)
Buck Benny Rides Again (1940) as Josephine
Santa Fe Trail (1940) as Maid (uncredited)
Love Thy Neighbor (1940) as Josephine
The Flame of New Orleans (1941) as Clementine
Blossoms in the Dust (1941) as Cleo
Our Wife (1941) as Hattie
Here Comes Mr. Jordan (1941) as Mother Listening to Hurdy-gurdy (uncredited)
Sing Your Worries Away (1942) as Hat Check Girl (uncredited)
Tough as They Come (1942) as Bessie Mae
Cat People (1942) as Minnie (uncredited)
I Walked with a Zombie (1943) as Alma, Maid
What's Buzzin', Cousin? (1943) as Blossom (uncredited)
Phantom Lady (1944)
Strange Illusion (1945) as Maid (uncredited)
Men in Her Diary (1945) as Violet (uncredited)
The Dolly Sisters (1945) as Ellabelle (uncredited)
Miss Susie Slagle's (1946) as Maid (uncredited)
Smooth as Silk (1946) as Louise
Three Little Girls in Blue (1946) as Maid (uncredited)
Swingtime Jamboree (1946)
Hit Parade of 1947 (1947) as Maid (uncredited)
Miracle on 34th Street (1947) as Cleo, the Walkers' maid / housekeeper (uncredited)
Merton of the Movies (1947) as Beulah's Maid (uncredited)
Out of the Past (1947) as Eunice Leonard (uncredited)
The Lady from Shanghai (1947) as Spectator in Courtroom (uncredited)
The Big Clock (1948) as Daisy, Strouds' Maid (uncredited)
The Velvet Touch (1948) as Nancy
Alias Nick Beal (1949) as Opal, Donna's Maid (uncredited)
Neptune's Daughter (1949) as Matilda the Maid (uncredited)
Tension (1949) as Woman in Drugstore (uncredited)
And Baby Makes Three (1949) as Wanda's Maid (uncredited)
The File on Thelma Jordon (1950) as Esther
Grounds for Marriage (1951) as Stella
Al Jennings of Oklahoma (1951) as Terese
The Company She Keeps (1951) as Lilly Johnson (uncredited)
Angel Face (1953) as Nurse Theresa (uncredited)
Small Town Girl (1953) as Backstage Maid (uncredited)
Here Come the Girls (1953) as Josie, Irene's Maid (uncredited)
The French Line (1953) as Clara, Mame's Maid (uncredited)
Back from Eternity (1956) as Mamie (uncredited)
Spoilers of the Forest (1957) as Nancy the Maid (uncredited)
The Gift of Love (1958) as Dora, Sam's Wife (uncredited) (final film role)

References

External links

 
 
 
 
 TCM Fan biography for Theresa Harris

1906 births
1985 deaths
African-American actresses
African-American women singers
American female dancers
American film actresses
American stage actresses
American television actresses
Burials at Angelus-Rosedale Cemetery
Actresses from Houston
Actresses from Inglewood, California
20th-century American actresses
20th-century American singers
20th-century American women singers
20th-century American dancers
California Democrats
Texas Democrats
African-American Methodists
20th-century Methodists